Jari Hudd (born 13 April 1965) is a retired Finnish football defender.

References 

1965 births
Living people
Finnish footballers
Vaasan Palloseura players
FC Kuusysi players
AIK Fotboll players
Kokkolan Palloveikot players
Mikkelin Palloilijat players
Association football defenders
Finnish expatriate footballers
Expatriate footballers in Sweden
Finnish expatriate sportspeople in Sweden
Veikkausliiga players
Allsvenskan players
Sportspeople from Vaasa